(born 31 August 1973, Kita, Tokyo) is a Japanese enka singer with Tokuma Japan Communications. She started her enka singing career in 1995.

Her songs are usually titled after Japanese landmarks and Japanese nature, which are widely accepted and well received, making Mizumori extremely popular and receiving many invitations to be the ambassador of many regions in Japan.

Unlike her enka singing peers, Mizumori usually performs in Western dresses, instead of the traditional kimono. Currently she holds the record of having the most top ten singles for a female enka singer. All her singles have entered the top 10 Oricon Chart since 2004.

Mizumori is also a regular at the annual NHK Red and White Song Festival, with New Year's Eve of 2017 marking her 15th appearance since her first in 2003.

Discography

External links 
 Kaori Mizumori

Enka singers
1973 births
Living people
Singers from Tokyo
Tokuma Japan Communications artists
21st-century Japanese singers
21st-century Japanese women singers